KVFE (88.5 FM) is a radio station broadcasting a Christian format. It is licensed to Del Rio, Texas.  The station is currently owned by World Radio Network, Inc.

The KVFE transmitter was turned on January 2, 2014, giving Inspiracom coverage of all border cities except San Diego/Tijuana. The application had been made in 1999, but a construction permit was not awarded until 2011, a timeline typical on the US-Mexico border.

FM translators
The following FM translator is authorized to rebroadcast KVFE.

References

External links

VFE
Radio stations established in 2014
Del Rio, Texas